During the siege of Maiozamalcha  (or Maogamalcha), 363 CE, the Roman army under Emperor Julian stormed, pillaged, and destroyed the city of Maiozamalcha, before continuing onward to the Sasanian capital of Ctesiphon.

Background                                                                                                                                          
In the year A.D. 363 the Roman Emperor Julian, hoping to avenge Roman defeats under his predecessor Constantius II and to establish his fame by accomplishing what had never been done by a Roman before - the subjection of the east - invaded the dominions of Shapur II, king of Persia. Assembling his strength at Carrhae in the Roman province of Mesopotamia, Julian divided his forces. While a part of the army (30,000 men, according to Ammianus Marcellinus) was dispatched north-east under his cousin Procopius and Count Sebastian to enlist the aid of Arshak II of Armenia for a march down the Tigris to Ctesiphon; Julian himself, with a larger force (65,000), penetrated Assyria to the south, proceeding along the Euphrates from Callinicum with the same ultimate destination. He crossed the frontier at Circesium, where it had been established by the peace of Diocletian, leaving a numerous detachment to secure his rear (10,000). Caught off guard by the force and direction of Julian's invasion, Shapur had failed to assemble forces in time for the defence of Assyria, and the former, in his course through the province, experienced a purely nominal resistance. Cavalry harried his wings, and the dykes and canals were released by the enemy to flood the country. However, these obstacles were surmounted; Anah capitulated; Macepracta was subdued; Pirisabora was reduced and sacked, and Julian promptly arrived under the walls of Maiozamalcha, a strongly fortified place 11 miles from the Persian capital of Ctesiphon.

The siege
The formidable defenses and strong garrison of the fortress of Maiozamalcha, determined Julian to effect its capture. A train of catapults and siege engines had attended the emperor's march through Assyria, and Julian employed them in vain against the impregnable fortifications; the frontal assault turned out to be a distraction from his real device. While the assault on the walls was repelled by a vigorous Persian defense, a mine was surreptitiously built under the very feet of defenders thanks to Julian's engineers, by means of which three cohorts, or 1,500 of the elite of the Roman soldiers, crept into the heart of the city. The city was instantly captured from the inside out with no mercy shown towards the astonished defenders or populace, who before its fall had - in insolent assurance - insulted Julian's arms and ally, the renegade prince of the Persian royal house, Hormisdas (or Hormizd).

Aftermath
Obsidional crowns were conferred on the bravest of the troops, in accordance with ancient practice. The adjacent palaces and gardens of the Persian monarchy were despoiled and burnt; and the capital, Ctesiphon, was exposed to Julian's hostile intents. Ultimately, the siege of that city was unsuccessful, though Julian crossed the Tigris and defeated the Persians in the field before retiring from before the adamant walls of the capital of the Sassanids. The lateness of the season, the revived forces of Shapur, and the treacherous advice of a captive Persian, by which the baggage and the river fleet were burnt, contributed to render Julian's position untenable, the northern army having failed to join him due to Tiran's resentment, and the expedition ended in disaster after Julian's death on the battlefield.

References

Maiozamalcha
Maiozamalcha
Maiozamalcha
Julian's Persian expedition